Patricia Ruggles is an economist and social statistician who studies poverty. Formerly the chief economist at the United States Department of Health and Human Services, she is now a Senior Fellow at the NORC at the University of Chicago.

Ruggles is the daughter of Yale University economists Nancy D. Ruggles and Richard Ruggles, and the granddaughter of Harvard University economist Clyde O. Ruggles.
She earned a bachelor's degree from Yale, and a master's degree and PhD from Harvard, all in economics.
She worked for the United States Congress Joint Economic Committee from 1990 to 1996, when she moved to the Department of Health and Human Services, and again from 2000 to 2003, when she retired. She joined the NORC in 2013.

She is a fellow of the American Statistical Association.

References

Year of birth missing (living people)
Living people
American economists
American women economists
American statisticians
Women statisticians
Yale University alumni
Harvard University alumni
Fellows of the American Statistical Association
21st-century American women